45 (forty-five) is the natural number following 44 and followed by 46.

In mathematics 

Forty-five is the sum of all single-digit decimal digits: . It is, equivalently, the ninth triangle number.

Forty-five is also the fourth hexagonal number and the second hexadecagonal number, or 16-gonal number. It is also the second smallest triangle number (after 1 and 10) that can be written as the sum of two squares. 

In decimal, 45 is a Kaprekar number and a Harshad number. 

Forty-five is a little Schroeder number; the next such number is 197, which is the 45th prime number.  

Forty-five is conjectured from Ramsey number .

If the Tits group is included as a sporadic group or nonstrict group of Lie type, then there are 45 classes of finite simple groups: 2 stem from cyclic and alternating groups, 16 are families of groups of Lie type, and another 26 are strictly sporadic.

In science
The atomic number of rhodium

Astronomy
Messier object M45, a magnitude 1.4 open cluster in the constellation Taurus, also known as the Pleiades
The New General Catalogue object NGC 45, a magnitude 10.6 spiral galaxy in the constellation Cetus

In music

 A type of gramophone record classified by its rotational speed of 45 revolutions per minute (rpm)
 The group Stars on 45 and its self-titled 1981 song, "Stars on 45"
 "45 and Fat", a 1996 song by Babybird
 "Forty-Five", the title of a 2000 song by The Atomic Bitchwax
 "45", the title of a 2002 song by Elvis Costello, both referring to the 45 rpm singles and to the artist's age when he wrote the song.
 "45", the title of a 2012 song by The Gaslight Anthem 
 "45", the title of a 2006 song by noodles
 "45", the title of a 2007 song by The Saturday Knights 
 "45", the title of a 2003 song by Shinedown
 45, the title of a 1982 album by Kino
 "Do the 45", the title of a 2007 song by Ryan Shaw
  is repeated continuously in the lyrics of the 1997 song "Brimful of Asha" by Cornershop

In other fields 

Forty-five may also refer to:
The '45 refers to the Jacobite rising of 1745 in Great Britain, or the year that World War II ended, which was 1945.
A card game: Forty-five.
.45 (film), a 2006 motion picture.
+45 is the telephone dialing code for Denmark.
45 (book), a book of essays by record producer Bill Drummond, derived both from the speed of a pop single and from his age when he finished writing it.
A football match consists of two periods of 45 minutes each.
Guns or ammunition of .45 caliber. In the United States, "45" is often a reference to one of two specific .45 caliber cartridges— the .45 Colt or the .45 ACP.
The number of the French department Loiret.
The maximum mark an International Baccalaureate student can obtain. 
In years of marriage, the sapphire wedding anniversary.
Forty-five (audio drama), a Big Finish 2008 audio play made for the forty fifth anniversary of the British science fiction television show Doctor Who.
Issue 45 of The North Briton was thought to be seditious but its publisher, John Wilkes, was celebrated as a champion of liberty.  The number 45 was used as a symbol of support for him.  Banquets were held with a theme of 45 while many items were produced showing the number or featuring it in some way.  For example, a wig was produced with 45 curls.
The number of the laps of the German Grand Prix from 1978 until 2001 (except 1985 because the race was held at Nürburgring).
Donald Trump, 45th President of the United States.

See also
 List of highways numbered 45

References

Integers